The Art of Being Right: 38 Ways to Win an Argument (also The Art of Controversy, or Eristic Dialectic: The Art of Winning an Argument; German: Eristische Dialektik: Die Kunst, Recht zu behalten; 1831) is an acidulous, sarcastic treatise written by the German philosopher Arthur Schopenhauer. In it, Schopenhauer examines a total of thirty-eight methods of defeating one's opponent in a debate. He introduces his essay with the idea that philosophers have concentrated in ample measure on the rules of logic, but have not (especially since the time of Immanuel Kant) engaged with the darker art of the dialectic, of controversy. Whereas the purpose of logic is classically said to be a method of arriving at the truth, dialectic, says Schopenhauer, "...on the other hand, would treat of the intercourse between two rational beings who, because they are rational, ought to think in common, but who, as soon as they cease to agree like two clocks keeping exactly the same time, create a disputation, or intellectual contest."

Publication 

In Volume 2, § 26, of his Parerga and Paralipomena, Schopenhauer wrote:

The tricks, dodges, and chicanery, to which they [men] resort in order to be right in the end, are so numerous and manifold and yet recur so regularly that some years ago I made them the subject of my own reflection and directed my attention to their purely formal element after I had perceived that, however varied the subjects of discussion and the persons taking part therein, the same identical tricks and dodges always come back and were very easy to recognize. This led me at the time to the idea of clearly separating the merely formal part of these tricks and dodges from the material and of displaying it, so to speak, as a neat anatomical specimen.

He "collected all the dishonest tricks so frequently occurring in argument and clearly presented each of them in its characteristic setting, illustrated by examples and given a name of its own." As an additional service, Schopenhauer "added a means to be used against them, as a kind of guard against these thrusts…."

However, when he later revised his book, he found "that such a detailed and minute consideration of the crooked ways and tricks that are used by common human nature to cover up its shortcomings is no longer suited to my temperament and so I lay it aside." He then recorded a few stratagems as specimens for anyone in the future who might care to write a similar essay. He also included, in Parerga and Paralipomena, Volume 2, § 26, an outline of what is essential to every disputation.

The Manuscript Remains left after Schopenhauer's death include a forty–six page section on "Eristic Dialectics". It contains thirty–eight stratagems and many footnotes. There is a preliminary discussion about the distinction between logic and dialectics. E. F. J. Payne has translated these notes into English.

A. C. Grayling edited T. Bailey Saunders' English translation in 2004.

Synopsis 

The following lists the 38 stratagems described by Schopenhauer, in the order of their appearance in the book:

 The Extension (Dana's Law)
 The Homonymy
 Generalize Your Opponent's Specific Statements
 Conceal Your Game
 False Propositions
 Postulate What Has to Be Proved
 Yield Admissions Through Questions
 Make Your Opponent Angry
 Questions in Detouring Order
 Take Advantage of the Nay-Sayer
 Generalize Admissions of Specific Cases
 Choose Metaphors Favourable to Your Proposition
 Agree to Reject the Counter-Proposition
 Claim Victory Despite Defeat
 Use Seemingly Absurd Propositions
 Arguments Ad Hominem
 Defense Through Subtle Distinction
 Interrupt, Break, Divert the Dispute
 Generalize the Matter, Then Argue Against it
 Draw Conclusions Yourself
 Meet Him With a Counter-Argument as Bad as His
 Petitio principii
 Make Him Exaggerate His Statement
 State a False Syllogism
 Find One Instance to the Contrary
 Turn the Tables
 Anger Indicates a Weak Point
 Persuade the Audience, Not the Opponent
 Diversion
 Appeal to Authority Rather Than Reason
 This Is Beyond Me
 Put His Thesis into Some Odious Category
 It Applies in Theory, but Not in Practice
 Don't Let Him Off the Hook
 Will Is More Effective Than Insight
 Bewilder Your opponent by Mere Bombast
 A Faulty Proof Refutes His Whole Position
 Become Personal, Insulting, Rude (argumentum ad personam)

See also 

 Big Lie
 Informal logic
 Logical fallacies
 Philosophical logic
 Reasoning

Notes

References 
 Grayling, A. C. (2004) The Art of Always Being Right: Thirty Eight Ways to Win When You Are Defeated 
 Parerga und Paralipomena, 1851; English Translation by E. F. J. Payne, Clarendon Press, Oxford, 1974, Vol 2, 
 Arthur Schopenhauer, Manuscript Remains, Volume III, English Translation by E. F. J. Payne, Berg Publishers Ltd.,

External links 
 Online version from Coolhaus.de, translated by T. Bailey Saunders in 1896. It shows the English translation parallel to the German text.

Works by Arthur Schopenhauer